Antisense therapy is a form of treatment that uses antisense oligonucleotides (ASOs) to target messenger RNA (mRNA). ASOs are capable of altering mRNA expression through a variety of mechanisms, including ribonuclease H mediated decay of the pre-mRNA, direct steric blockage, and exon content modulation through splicing site binding on pre-mRNA. Several ASOs have been approved in the United States, the European Union, and elsewhere.

Nomenclature 
The common stem for antisense oligonucleotides drugs is -rsen. The substem -virsen designates antiviral antisense oligonucleotides.

Pharmacokinetics and pharmacodynamics

Half-life and stability 
ASO-based drugs employ highly modified, single-stranded chains of synthetic nucleic acids that achieve wide tissue distribution with very long half-lives. For instance, many ASO-based drugs contain phosphorothioate substitutions and 2' sugar modifications to inhibit nuclease degradation enabling vehicle-free delivery to cells.

In vivo delivery 
Phosphorothioate ASOs can be delivered to cells without the need of a delivery vehicle. ASOs do not penetrate the blood brain barrier when delivered systemically but they can distribute across the neuraxis if injected in the cerebrospinal fluid typically by intrathecal administration. Newer formulations using conjugated ligands greatly enhances delivery efficiency and cell-type specific targeting.

Approved therapies

Batten disease 
Milasen is a novel individualized therapeutic agent that was designed and approved by the FDA for the treatment of Batten disease. This therapy serves as an example of personalized medicine.

In 2019, a report was published detailing the development of milasen, an antisense oligonucleotide drug for Batten disease, under an expanded-access investigational clinical protocol authorized by the Food and Drug Administration (FDA). Milasen "itself remains an investigational drug, and it is not suited for the treatment of other patients with Batten's disease" because it was customized for a single patient's specific mutation. However it is an example of individualized genomic medicine therapeutical intervention.

Cytomegalovirus retinitis
Fomivirsen (marketed as Vitravene), was approved by the U.S. FDA in August 1998, as a treatment for cytomegalovirus retinitis.

Duchenne muscular dystrophy 
Several morpholino oligos have been approved to treat specific groups of mutations causing Duchenne muscular dystrophy. In September 2016, eteplirsen (ExonDys51) received FDA approval for the treatment of cases that can benefit from skipping exon 51 of the dystrophin transcript. In December 2019, golodirsen (Vyondys 53) received FDA approval for the treatment of cases that can benefit from skipping exon 53 of the dystrophin transcript. In August 2020, viltolarsen (Viltepso) received FDA approval for the treatment of cases that can benefit from skipping exon 53 of the dystrophin transcript.

Familial chylomicronaemia syndrome
Volanesorsen was approved by the European Medicines Agency (EMA) for the treatment of familial chylomicronaemia syndrome in May 2019.

Familial hypercholesterolemia
In January 2013 mipomersen (marketed as Kynamro) was approved by the FDA for the treatment of homozygous familial hypercholesterolemia.

Hereditary transthyretin-mediated amyloidosis
Inotersen received FDA approval for the treatment of hereditary transthyretin-mediated amyloidosis in October 2018. The application for inotersen was granted orphan drug designation. It was developed by Ionis Pharmaceuticals and licensed to Akcea Therapeutics. Patisiran (sold under Onpattro) was developed by Alnylam Pharmaceuticals, and also approved for use in the US and EU in 2018 with orphan drug designation. Its mechanism-of-action is the active substance of small interfering RNA (siRNA), which allows it to interfere with and block the production of trasnthyretin. As such, it was the first FDA-approved siRNA therapeutic.

Spinal muscular atrophy
In 2004, development of an antisense therapy for spinal muscular atrophy began. Over the following years, an antisense oligonucleotide later named nusinersen was developed by Ionis Pharmaceuticals under a licensing agreement with Biogen. In December 2016, nusinersen received regulatory approval from FDA and soon after, from other regulatory agencies worldwide.

Investigational therapies

Current clinical trials 
As of 2020 more than 50 antisense oligonucleotides were in clinical trials, including over 25 in advanced clinical trials (phase II or III).

Phase III trials

Amyotrophic lateral sclerosis 
Tofersen (also known as IONIS-SOD1Rx and BIIB067) is currently being tested in a phase 3 trial for amyotrophic lateral sclerosis (ALS) due to mutations in the SOD1 gene. Results from a phase 1/2 trial have been promising. It is being developed by Biogen under a licensing agreement with Ionis Pharmaceuticals.

Hereditary transthyretin-mediated amyloidosis 
A follow-on drug to Inotersen is being developed by Ionis Pharmaceuticals and under license to Akcea Therapeutics for hereditary transthyretin-mediated amyloidosis. In this formulation the ASO is conjugated to N-Acetylgalactosamine enabling hepatocyte-specific delivery, greatly reducing dose requirements and side effect profile while increasing the level of transthyretin reduction in patients.

Huntington's disease 
Tominersen (also known as IONIS-HTTRx and RG6042) was tested in a phase 3 trial for Huntington's disease although this trial was discontinued on March 21, 2021, due to lack of efficacy. It is currently licensed to Roche by Ionis Pharmaceuticals.

Phase I and II trials 
Clinical trials are ongoing for several diseases and conditions including:

Acromegaly, age related macular degeneration, Alzheimer's disease, amyotrophic lateral sclerosis, autosomal dominant retinitis pigmentosa, beta thalassemia, cardiovascular disease, elevated level of lipoprotein(a), centronuclear myopathy, coagulopathies, cystic fibrosis, Duchenne muscular dystrophy, diabetes, epidermolysis bullosa dystrophica, familial chylomicronemia syndrome, frontotemporal dementia, Fuchs' dystrophy, hepatitis B, hereditary angioedema, hypertension, IgA nephropathy, Leber's hereditary optic neuropathy, multiple system atrophy, non-alcoholic fatty liver disease, Parkinson's disease, prostate cancer, Stargardt disease, STAT3-expressing cancers, Usher syndrome.

Preclinical development 
Several ASOs are currently being investigated in disease models for Alexander disease, ATXN2 (gene) and FUS (gene) amyotrophic lateral sclerosis, Angelman syndrome, Lafora disease, lymphoma, multiple myeloma, myotonic dystrophy, Parkinson's disease, Pelizaeus–Merzbacher disease, and prion disease, Rett syndrome, spinocerebellar Ataxia Type 3.

See also 
 Antisense
 Antisense mRNA
 Locked nucleic acid
 Morpholino
 Oligonucleotide synthesis
 Peptide nucleic acid
 RNA interference (which uses double-strand RNA)

References

External links 
 Antisense Pharma: Promising Phase IIb Results Of Targeted Therapy With AP 12009 In Recurrent Anaplastic Astrocytoma

Applied genetics
Biotechnology
Therapeutic gene modulation